Prior to its uniform adoption of proportional representation in 1999, the United Kingdom used first-past-the-post for the European elections in England, Scotland and Wales. The European Parliament constituencies used under that system were smaller than the later regional constituencies and only had one Member of the European Parliament each.

The constituency of Worcestershire and South Warwickshire was one of them.

It consisted of the Westminster Parliament constituencies (on their 1983 boundaries) of Bromsgrove, Mid Worcestershire, Rugby and Kenilworth, South Worcestershire, Stratford-on-Avon, Warwick and Leamington, and Worcester.

Members of the European Parliament

Results

References

European Parliament constituencies in England (1979–1999)
Politics of Worcestershire
Politics of Warwickshire
1994 establishments in England
1999 disestablishments in England
Constituencies established in 1994
Constituencies disestablished in 1999